Yurmala is a rural locality (a village) in Plesetsky District, Arkhangelsk Oblast, Russia. The population was 21 as of 2012.

Geography 
Yurmala is located on the Puksa River, 114 km east of Plesetsk (the district's administrative centre) by road. Yakshina is the nearest rural locality.

References 

Rural localities in Plesetsky District